Chang Rong Si Bridge (Saphan Chang Rong Si) is a bridge and monument in the Rattanakosin Island area of Phra Nakhon District, the historic centre of Bangkok. The bridge spans Khlong Khu Mueang Doem, the old city moat, and is locate behind the Ministry of Defense and at the front corner of the Ministry of Interior. It signifies the beginning of Bamrung Mueang Road as it continues eastward from Kanlayana Maitri Road. Atsadang Road meets the bridge's eastern foot at the eponymous Saphan Chang Rong Si Intersection, while Rachini Road runs alongside the canal on the opposite side. 

The bridge was originally built for elephants that returned from war and was located near a rice mill, hence came the name "Saphan Chang Rong Si", which literally means "elephants' bridge at rice mill". It was originally a wooden bridge and there were  three similar bridges which were later demolished.

During the reign of King Chulalongkorn (Rama V), the bridge was restored by Prince Damrong Rajanubhab, the chancellor of the interior, in 1910. The end pieces feature sculptures of dogs' heads that symbolise the year of the dog in the Chinese zodiac.

Chang Rong Si was listed as a registered ancient monument of Bangkok in 1988.

Gallery

References

External links

Phra Nakhon district
Bridges in Bangkok
Registered ancient monuments in Bangkok
Road junctions in Bangkok